Luis Ruiz Sayago (born 30 June 1992) is a Spanish footballer who plays as a left back.

Football career
Born in Huelva, Andalusia, Ruiz finished his graduation with Atlético Madrid's youth setup, and made his senior debuts with the C-team in Tercera División. On 5 August 2013 he moved to CD Leganés, in Segunda División B.

Ruiz appeared in 28 matches during his debut campaign, as the Madrid side were promoted to Segunda División after a ten-year absence, and signed a new one-year deal on 7 July 2014.

On 24 August 2014 Ruiz played his first match as a professional, starting in a 1–1 home draw against Deportivo Alavés. He contributed with 20 appearances during the 2015–16 season, as his side achieved promotion to La Liga for the first time ever.

On 2 August 2016, free agent Ruiz signed for Cádiz CF, still in the second division. The following 28 June, after appearing rarely, he moved to fellow league team CD Lugo.

On 5 August 2019, Ruiz agreed to a one-year deal with Deportivo de La Coruña also in division two. On 7 September of the following year, after Dépors relegation, he returned to his previous club lugo on a one-year contract.

References

External links
Leganés official profile 

1992 births
Living people
Footballers from Huelva
Spanish footballers
Association football defenders
Segunda División players
Segunda División B players
Tercera División players
Atlético Madrid C players
Atlético Madrid B players
CD Leganés players
Cádiz CF players
CD Lugo players
Deportivo de La Coruña players